Marcel Georges Valère Céline Dubuisson (5 April 1903 – 25 October 1974) was a Belgian zoologist and professor at the University of Liège

Dubuisson was born in Olsene, which is part of Zulte, in 1903. He married Adèle Brouha, the sister of medical researcher and University of Liège alumni Lucien Brouha. He was  rector of the University of Liège from 1953 to 1971. He died in Liège in 1974 and was buried at the Cimetière de Robermont.

References

1903 births
1974 deaths
20th-century Belgian zoologists
Academic staff of the University of Liège
Rectors of universities in Belgium
People from Zulte